The Appleton Papermakers were a minor league baseball team located in Appleton, Wisconsin. They were part of the Wisconsin-Illinois League from 1909-1914 and was in the Wisconsin State League from 1940-1942 and 1946-1953. The team was coached by Dutch Zwilling during part of the 1942 season.

Notable alumni

Hall of Fame alumni

Travis Jackson (1952-1953, MGR) Inducted, 1982

Notable alumni

 Mike Garcia (1942) 3 x MLB All-Star; 2 x AL ERA Title (1949, 1954)

 Billy Klaus (1946)

 Pat Seerey (1941)

 Joe Tipton (1941)

References

Defunct minor league baseball teams
Sports in Appleton, Wisconsin
Defunct baseball teams in Wisconsin
St. Louis Browns minor league affiliates
Cleveland Guardians minor league affiliates
Philadelphia Phillies minor league affiliates
Boston Braves minor league affiliates
Milwaukee Braves minor league affiliates
Wisconsin State League teams
Wisconsin-Illinois League teams
Baseball teams disestablished in 1953
Baseball teams established in 1909